Lemon is both a tree and the fruit borne by that tree.

Lemon or Lemons may also refer to:

Persons
 Lemon Andersen (born 1975), American poet, spoken word artist, and actor
 Lemon (drag queen), Canadian drag queen
 Lemon (surname), a list of people with the surname
 Lemons (surname), a list of people with the surname

Places
 Lemon, Kentucky, United States, an unincorporated community
 Lemons, Missouri, United States, a census-designated place
 Lemon Grove, California, United States, a city
 River Lemon, England, a river

Arts and entertainment

Music
 The Lemons, American rock band from Seattle, Washington
 Lemons (album), an album by Ty Segall
 Lemons (EP), debut EP from Melbourne-based acoustic-folk band Woodlock
 "Lemon" (U2 song), 1993
 "Lemon" (N.E.R.D and Rihanna song), 2017
 "Lemon" (Kenshi Yonezu song), 2018

Films
 Lemon (1969 film), an American experimental short
 Lemon (2013 film), a Chinese romantic comedy
 Lemon (2017 film), an American comedy drama

Fictional characters 
 A character in the play Aunt Dan and Lemon
 Liz Lemon, on the television series 30 Rock
 Keith Lemon portrayed by English comedian Leigh Francis (b. 1973)
 Lemon Breeland, on the television series Hart of Dixie
A group of criminals led by Sir Miles Axlerod in the movie Cars 2

Other arts and entertainment
 "Lemons" (Red Dwarf), an episode of the British television series Red Dwarf
 Lemon (short story), a short story by Motojirō Kajii
 Lemon (novella), a novella by Kwon Yeo-sun
 Lemon (card game)

Computing
 LEMON (C++ library)
 Lemon Parser Generator
 Lemon (developer), an American video game development company
 OntoLex-Lemon (and its predecessor Lemon) a community standard for lexicalizing ontologies and for publishing lexical data on the web

Other uses
 Lemon (automobile), a defective car
 Lemon (color)
 Lemon v. Kurtzman'', a U.S. Supreme Court decision
 Lemon technique, a method to determine the relative strength of thunderstorm cells
 Lemon Party or Parti Citron, a frivolous Canadian political party
 Lemon (geometry), the shape of, for example, an American football

See also 
 24 Hours of LeMons, a less-than-serious series of endurance races
 Lemmon (disambiguation)